Sheikh Ahmed (died 1529) was the last Khan of the Great Horde, a remnant of the Golden Horde.

Life 
He was one of the three sons of Ahmed Khan bin Küchük, the man who lost Russia in 1480.  After the assassination of Ahmed Khan in 1481, his sons feuded for power and it only further weakened the Horde. The Horde, then allied with the Grand Duchy of Lithuania, was fighting with the Crimean Khanate, allied with the Grand Duchy of Moscow.

In 1500, the Muscovite–Lithuanian War resumed. Lithuania once again allied with the Great Horde. In 1501, Khan Sheikh Ahmed attacked Muscovite forces near Rylsk, Novhorod-Siverskyi, and Starodub. Lithuanian Grand Duke Alexander Jagiellon was preoccupied with his succession in the Kingdom of Poland and did not participate in the campaign. A harsh winter combined with burning of the steppe by Meñli I Giray, Khan of the Crimean Khanate, resulted in famine among Sheikh Ahmed's forces. Many of his men deserted him and the remainder was defeated on the Sula River in June 1502.

Sheikh Ahmed was forced into exile. He sought refuge at the Ottoman Empire or an alliance with the Grand Duchy of Moscow, before turning to the Grand Duchy of Lithuania. Instead of helping its former ally, the Grand Duchy imprisoned Sheikh Ahmed for over 20 years. He was used as a bargaining chip in negotiations with the Crimean Khanate: if the Khanate did not behave, Sheikh Ahmed would be released and would resume his war with the Khanate. Meñli I Giray became a reluctant ally of Lithuania. Sheikh Ahmed was held in Trakai and moved to Kaunas Castle after an escape attempt.

After the Battle of Olshanitsa in January 1527, Sheikh Ahmed was released from prison. It is said that he managed to seize power in the Astrakhan Khanate. He died around 1529.

Genealogy
Genghis Khan
Jochi
Orda Khan
Sartaqtay
Köchü
Bayan
Sasibuqa
Ilbasan
Chimtay
Urus
Temur-Malik
Temür Qutlugh
Temur ibn Temur Qutlugh
Küchük Muhammad
Ahmed Khan bin Küchük
Sheikh Ahmed

References
In-line

Bibliography

1529 deaths
Khans of the Golden Horde
15th-century monarchs in Europe
Year of birth unknown